Phosphorus tricyanide is an inorganic compound with the chemical formula P(CN)3. It can be produced by the reaction of phosphorus trichloride and trimethyl(iso)cyanosilane. The reaction of phosphorus tribromide and silver cyanide in diethyl ether produce phosphorus tricyanide too. Its thermal decomposition can produce graphite phase C3N3P. Phosphorus tricyanide reacts with Re(CO)5FBF3 to form {P[CN-Re(CO)5]3}(BF4)3.

References

Phosphorus(III) compounds
Cyanides